Nichi is a given name and nickname, and may refer to:

 Nichi Farnham (born 1963), American politician
 Nichi Hodgson (born 1983), British journalist, broadcaster, and author
 Nichi Vendola (born 1958), Italian politician

See also

 Nicci (disambiguation)
 Nicki, a given name

Nicknames
Feminine given names